Jacques van den Broek (born 24 May 1960, Goes) is the CEO of Randstad Holding since March 2014. He also serves as the company's chairman. He joined the company as a branch manager in 1988. He once served as an independent director of Vedior. He holds a degree in law from Tilburg University.

References

1960 births
Living people
Dutch chief executives
People from Goes
Tilburg University alumni